James Pace Early College High School is a 5A public high school in Brownsville, Texas (USA). It is home to the Criminal Justice and Law Enforcement magnet program for the Brownsville Independent School District. In 2015, the school was rated "Met Standard" by the Texas Education Agency.

Athletics
The Pace Vikings compete in the following sports:

Baseball
Basketball
Cross Country
Football
Golf
Powerlifting
Soccer
Softball
Swimming and Diving
Tennis
Track and Field
Volleyball

State Titles
Boys Cross Country - 
2004(4A)

References

External links
 

Education in Brownsville, Texas
Educational institutions established in 1996
Brownsville Independent School District high schools
Magnet schools in Texas
1996 establishments in Texas